Hyposmocoma abjecta is a species of moth of the family Cosmopterigidae. It was first described by Arthur Gardiner Butler in 1881. It is endemic to the Hawaiian island of Oahu. The type locality is Haleakalā.

The larvae have been recorded on dead Freycinetia and other types of wood.

External links

abjecta
Endemic moths of Hawaii
Moths described in 1881